Several vessels of the French Navy have been named Singe:

French ship Le Singe (1744), a catboat of the French Navy launched in 1744
French ship Le Singe (1752), a catboat of the French Navy launched in 1752
French xebec Singe (1762), a Renard-class xebec of the French Navy launched in 1762